Bascombe is an English (originally from Norman) surname meaning “valley of burrs and bristles”. Notable people with the surname include:

Herbert Bascombe (born 1964), Bermudian cricketer
Miles Bascombe (born 1986), Vincentian cricketer

See also
Bascom (disambiguation)
Bascomb
Bascome
Baskcomb
Boscombe